Scott Kalvert (August 15, 1964 – March 5, 2014) was an American film director, known mainly for his 1995 film The Basketball Diaries, starring Leonardo DiCaprio and Mark Wahlberg, and 2002's Deuces Wild, starring Stephen Dorff and Brad Renfro.
 
He was also a successful music video director, collaborating with artists such as Cyndi Lauper, Jetboy, Snoop Doggy Dogg, DJ Jazzy Jeff and The Fresh Prince, Bobby Brown, Taylor Dayne, Deep Blue Something, Billy Ocean, Marky Mark and the Funky Bunch, LL Cool J, Samantha Fox, Eric B. & Rakim and Salt 'n' Pepa.

Kalvert was found dead in his home in Woodland Hills, Los Angeles on March 5, 2014, from an apparent suicide. He left behind his wife and two daughters.

Selected filmography
 The Basketball Diaries (1995)
 Deuces Wild (2002)

References

External links

1964 births
2014 suicides
American music video directors
Film directors from New York City
Suicides in California